"Oh Yeah!" is a song recorded by American rock band Green Day for their thirteenth studio album, Father of All Motherfuckers (2020). Band members Billie Joe Armstrong, Tré Cool, and Mike Dirnt all co-wrote the song, which samples Joan Jett's cover of "Do You Wanna Touch Me". "Oh Yeah!" was released on January 16, 2020, through Reprise Records as the album's third single. It later made its radio debut on January 28, 2020.

Background and composition
"Oh Yeah!" was originally titled "Bulletproof Backpack" but was re-titled at some point in the production process to more closely associate it with "Do You Wanna Touch Me", which the song samples in its chorus. This represents the first time the band has sampled another artist's work. The writers of "Do You Wanna Touch Me", Gary Glitter and Mike Leander, both receive writing credits on the track. The band described Glitter as a "total asshole" because of his sexual abuse convictions and pledged to donate their royalties from the track to International Justice Mission and Rape, Abuse & Incest National Network. The lyrics of "Oh Yeah!" address celebrity culture and the polarization of modern society.

The song has been described as pop rock by The Daily Californian, power pop by Ultimate Classic Rock, glam rock by Associated Press, and synth-pop by Louder Sound.

Commercial performance 
The song topped the Billboard Alternative Songs Chart at the week ending of April 18, 2020. This broke the record previously held by Red Hot Chili Peppers for the longest span of Alternative Songs chart toppers, as 'Longview' became their first chart topper in June 1994.

Music video
An accompanying music video directed by Malia James premiered January 16, 2020. The clip opens with drummer Tré Cool filming a tutorial on how to play the song. A driver is shown watching this video as the camera zooms out from the tutorial and promptly hits lead singer Billie Joe Armstrong in a grocery store parking lot as a result. This incident is filmed by a fan nearby and goes viral. While Armstrong shows up on multiple occasions throughout the video, Mike Dirnt and Tré Cool have recurring appearances as a security guard (who recognizes Armstrong) and a news reporter respectively. Throughout the rest of the video, various people take selfies and are otherwise absorbed by their phones. Celebrity status and social media obsession are two themes in the video identified by critics.

Charts

Weekly charts

Year-end charts

Release history

References

Green Day songs
2019 songs
2020 singles
American synth-pop songs
Charity singles
Reprise Records singles
Songs written by Billie Joe Armstrong
Songs written by Tré Cool
Songs written by Mike Dirnt
American power pop songs
Glam rock songs
Songs written by Gary Glitter
Songs written by Mike Leander
American pop rock songs